The Janissary revolts were a series of slave soldier revolts in the Ottoman Empire.

Revolts
 Buçuktepe rebellion (1446)
 Janissary revolt (1525)
 Beylerbeyi event (1589)
 Edirne event (1703)
 Patrona Halil revolt (1730)
 1806 Edirne incident (1806)
 Auspicious Incident (1826)

Rebellions against the Ottoman Empire